Clyde "Skip" Battin (February 18, 1934 – July 6, 2003) was an American singer-songwriter, bassist, performer, and recording artist. He was a member of the Byrds, the New Riders of the Purple Sage, and the Flying Burrito Brothers.

Εarly life
Clyde Raybould Battin was born in Gallipolis, Ohio, USA, attending local schools. He discovered the electric bass when he was 17 years old.

Two years later, he moved to Tucson to attend physical education classes at the University of Arizona. With fellow student Gary Paxton, he formed a college band, the Pledges. As Gary and Clyde, they recorded the single "Why Not Confess" (with "Johnny Risk" on the flipside) for Rev Records, a local label. In 1959, they went into the Desert Palm Studios in Phoenix, Arizona, the home of guitarist Duane Eddy, and recorded some Paxton compositions.

Entrepreneur Bob Shad issued the demo of the duo's song "It Was I" on his Brent label, and renamed the act as "Skip & Flip". Their song eventually made No 11 in the American charts. The follow-up, "Fancy Nancy", was a minor hit, but they charted again in 1960 with a cover of the Marvin and Johnny ballad "Cherry Pie". The novelty number "Hully Gully Cha Cha Cha", written by Paxton and Battin, garnered airplay but did not make the charts. A short time later, the pair disbanded.

In 1961, Battin moved to California, where he got small acting parts in films and on television. In 1966, after a few years out of the music industry, he formed the short-lived folk-rock group Evergreen Blueshoes, whose one album appeared on the Amos label. After the album failed to sell, Battin concentrated instead on session work for many musicians, such as Gene Vincent, Warren Zevon, and others.

Fame

Battin is probably best known as bass guitarist and songwriter with the Byrds from 1970 to 1973. He was—by eight years—the oldest member of the Byrds. He recorded three albums with them and toured extensively. Many of his songwriting contributions were co-written with Kim Fowley. After the breakup of the Columbia Byrds, Battin recorded a solo album, Skip.

In February 1973, he began work on his Topanga Skyline solo album. After it was completed, it was shelved for unclear reasons. Battin was invited to join the country-rock group New Riders of the Purple Sage, with whom he recorded three albums from 1974 to 1976.

He left the group to join his ex-Byrd cohort Gene Parsons in a new line up of the Flying Burrito Brothers. Meanwhile, he was replaced in the New Riders within the year by Stephen A. Love.

In 1984, Battin got into a fight with Roger McGuinn after a live performance in London, UK, when McGuinn failed to pay wages to a line-up called the Peace Seekers.

From 1989 to 1991, Battin toured occasionally with Michael Clarke's Byrds, named "The Byrds featuring Michael Clarke." After Clarke's death, the band continued as The Byrds Celebration, with Battin the sole ex-Byrds member. He stopped touring and recording after his Alzheimer's disease had reached an advanced state.

Personal life
Battin married and had a son, Brent. In the 1980s he remarried, had a son, John-Clyde and daughter, Susanna, while pursuing his dream of farming with his wife Patricia in the agricultural Willamette valley of Oregon. Battin died on July 6, 2003, of complications from Alzheimer's disease in a care facility in Salem, Oregon.

In 2012, following negotiations undertaken by his son Brent with the record company, the 1973 solo album  Topanga Skyline was released on Sierra records in celebration of the 40th anniversary of Skip Battin's first appearance with the Byrds.

Discography

Solo albums
 1972: Skip (Signpost)
 1981: Navigator (Appaloosa)
 1984: Don't Go Crazy (Appaloosa)
 2012: Topanga Skyline (Sierra) (recorded July 17–30, 1973 in Hollywood CA)
 2017: Skip Battin's Italian Dream (Appaloosa Records)

Collaborations
 1985: Live in Italy (Moondance) with Sneaky Pete Kleinow and 
 1998: Family Tree (Folkest Dischi) with John York, Ricky Mantoan, and Beppe D'Angelo

With The Byrds
 1970: (Untitled) (Columbia)
 1971: Byrdmaniax (Columbia)
 1971: Farther Along (Columbia)
 2008: Live At The Royal Albert Hall 1971 (Sundazed)

With The Flying Burrito Brothers
 1976: Airborne (Columbia)
 1979: Live from Tokyo (Regency)
 1981: Hearts on the Line (Curb) as The Burrito Brothers
 1983: Hollywood Nights 1979–82 (Sundown)
 1985: Cabin Fever (Relix)
 1986: Live from Europe (Relix)
 1991: Close Encounters on the West Coast (Relix)

With New Riders of the Purple Sage

 1974: Brujo (Columbia)
 1975: Oh, What a Mighty Time (Columbia)
 1976: New Riders (MCA)
 1993: Live on Stage (Relix)
 2005: Armadillo World Headquarters, Austin, TX, 6/13/75 (Kufala)

Also appears on
 1969: Evergreen Blueshoes – The Ballad of Evergreen Blueshoes (Amos)
 1969: Warren Zevon – Wanted Dead or Alive (Imperial)
 1973: Kim Fowley – International Heroes (Capitol)
 1975: Earl Scruggs Revue – Anniversary Special Volume One (Columbia)
 1978: Kim Fowley – Visions of the Future (Capitol)
 1979: Sneaky Pete Kleinow – Sneaky Pete (Shiloh)

References

Further reading
Skip Battin And The Dancing Bears, a memory

External links
 
 
Skip Battin obituary in the Los Angeles Times, July 10, 2003
Skip Battin discography at Byrds Flyght
Skip Battin interview at American Music Belgium

1934 births
2003 deaths
People from Gallipolis, Ohio
American country rock singers
American rock songwriters
American rock singers
The Byrds members
The Flying Burrito Brothers members
Deaths from Alzheimer's disease
American rock bass guitarists
Neurological disease deaths in Oregon
American male singer-songwriters
20th-century American singers
American country singer-songwriters
American country bass guitarists
American male bass guitarists
New Riders of the Purple Sage members
Guitarists from Ohio
20th-century American bass guitarists
20th-century American male singers
Singer-songwriters from Ohio